Jennylyn Anne Pineda Mercado-Ho (born May 15, 1987) is a Filipino actress, singer, and songwriter. She was the winner of the first season of the reality talent competition StarStruck. Mercado garnered acclaim at a young age for her acting performances on television and film. She starred in multiple commercially successful films, including English Only, Please (2014), The Prenup (2015), Walang Forever (2015), and Just the 3 of Us (2016). With GMA Records and Viva Records, Mercado has released three albums, which have several popular singles such as "Sa Aking Panaginip", "Moments Of Love" in collaboration with Janno Gibbs, "Basta't Nandito Ka", and "Kahit Sandali". In 2017, Mercado top billed the Philippine remake of My Love from the Star.

Mercado's success in Philippine cinema has made her one of the top actresses in the country and established her status as the "Ultimate Star".

Early life and family
Jennylyn Anne Pineda Mercado was born on May 15, 1987 in Parañaque, Metro Manila. She spent her senior year of high school at the Augustinian Abbey School in Las Piñas. As a child, Mercado suffered physical abuse from her stepfather. Her biological mother returned from Dubai merely to bail her stepfather out. Henceforth, Mercado was raised by her aunt, whom she considers as her mother.

Career

Early years
Mercado started as a recording artist with Alpha Records in 1999 through the recommendation of her voice coach, Susanna Pichay. Mercado was in Nonoy Tan's singing group, G4. The group recorded two songs but never released an album due to two of the four members dropping out. After G4, Mercado went into commercial modeling, landing a stint with Bambini cologne and a Pond's TV advertisement. She was also part of the Elite Circle of "10 Modeling Search", where she competed with StarStruck co-finalist, Dion Ignacio.

In 2002, Mercado made her debut acting appearance playing a minor role in ABS-CBN's TV series Kay Tagal Kang Hinintay, which was top-billed by Bea Alonzo and John Lloyd Cruz.

2003–2007: Starstruck
In 2003, Mercado joined the reality show StarStruck. She and Mark Herras won, receiving 1,000,000 pesos and exclusive contracts from the GMA Network. After winning StarStruck, Mercado starred in numerous TV series, including Encantadia, I Luv NY, Dangal, Super Twins, Paano Ba Ang Mangarap?, SRO Cinemaserye: Suspetsa, Ikaw Sana, and Gumapang Ka Sa Lusak. She also acted in films such as So Happy Together (2004) and teen-flick Let the Love Begin (2005).

Mercado released her first album Living the Dream, which contained original compositions by Vehnee Saturno, and a carrier single titled "Kahit Sandali". In May 2006, Mercado released her second album Letting Go, which included the single "Sa Aking Panaginip" by Vehnee Saturno. Mercado's first major concert was held at the Music Museum in Greenhills on 15 May 2006. In May 2009, she held a sold-out birthday concert titled "I Am Woman" at the Music Museum. In January 2010, under Viva Records, she released her third album, Love Is... Jennylyn Mercado.

2007–2014 
Mercado starred in Filipino period piece Rosario (2010). Her acting career was handled by Becky Aguila and Viva Entertainment, where she joined her Starstruck co-alumnus Cristine Reyes. Mercado's singing career was managed by Viva Records. In 2011, her contract with Viva ended and was not renewed, though she joined Cristine Reyes. In 2013, Mercado signed with Regal Entertainment. She also signed with PolyEast Records, hoping to her reinvent herself as singer.

Mercado branched out into television hosting, hosting reality series Protégé: The Battle for the Big Break with co-hosts Ogie Alcasid and Dingdong Dantes. She was also in the GMA-7 Sunday talk show, Showbiz Central.

In 2013, Mercado acted in the romance The Bride and the Lover (2013). Her contract with Polyeast Records ended that year. In 2014, she played the role of a woman with a split personality through Rhodora X. According to Mercado, this was the most challenging role she has ever played. In late 2014, she released her fifth album through GMA Records.

At the end of 2014, Mercado agreed to participate in the 2014 Metro Manila Film Festival (MMFF). Her entry, English Only, Please (2014), was originally offered to singer-actress Angeline Quinto and was chosen as one of the eight official movies for the film festival. It became a success despite having fewer promotions than the other movies included. Critics deemed it a "sleeper hit". In the film, Mercado played the role of Tere Madlansacay, a Filipino tutor. The film's success established her as a movie star. In early 2015, Mercado received the MMFF Best Actress award for the recently concluded film festival.

2015–present 
In 2015, Mercado was first in the FHM "Philippines' 100 Sexiest Women" list after Marian Rivera vacated the title. Before Mercado traveled to New York for the film PreNup with actor Sam Milby, she was surprised and given a plaque by publisher Aeus Reyes, Allan Altera, and GMA News reporter Nelson Canlas. On 11 July, Mercado participated in the two-part FHM 100 Sexiest party at the SMX Convention Center in the SM Mall of Asia.

Mercado played the lead role of Melanie "Mel" Fernandez-Dela Paz in the GMA series My Faithful Husband, which aired on 10 August 2015. Despite its success, the series was not extended due to scheduling conflicts with Mercado, who at the time was acting in two films, The Prenup and WalangForever. The series earned the lead actors multiple acting awards and nominations. After the commercial success of WalangForever, Mercado earned her second consecutive MMFF Best Actress award in 2015.

Through social media, Mercado announced her upcoming project, confirming that she was acting in a new film with actor John Lloyd Cruz. The film, titled Just the 3 of Us, was produced by Star Cinema. It earned 16 million pesos in its opening day, which was the highest opening day gross of any of Mercado's movies and set a record for the highest opening day gross for a Philippine film. It went on to be one of the highest-grossing Philippine films of 2016.

After months of negotiations, Mercado and the GMA Network renewed their contract on 4 July 2016. As part of the contract, Mercado hosted GMA's new comedy-singing show Superstar Duets. She was later chosen to play the role of Steffi for the Philippine remake of the South Korean series My Love from the Star.

In October 2018, Mercado became the first Filipina brand ambassador for international makeup brand Max Factor.

Advocacies 
Mercado has spoken often on the matter of women's rights, particularly violence against women. She has been recognized by GABRIELA, a Philippine women's organization, which has made her an honorary member.

Personal life 
In 2008, at age 21, Mercado announced that she was pregnant. Her ex-boyfriend Patrick Garcia, who distanced himself upon learning of her pregnancy, was announced as the father of her child. On 16 August 2008, she gave birth to her son, Alex Jazz, via Caesarian section.

In 2021, she married her longtime boyfriend Dennis Trillo.

Athletics

Mercado is also an aspiring triathlete. In her free time, she takes jujitsu and Muay Thai lessons. "They built up my muscles. I looked heavy onscreen," Mercado recounted. "I realized that I needed cardio exercises to slim down." She discovered running and biking, which soon led her to join duathlon competitions in Alabang and Laguna. She is also a diver and wishes to inspire people to be environment friendly.

Mercado is a practitioner of Tabimina Balintawak, a close-range variant of Balintawak Arnis created Grandmaster Bobby Tabimina, who in turn developed its principles after studying the Balintawak system developed by Grandmaster Venancio Bacon in the 1950s.

Filmography

Drama television series

Drama anthology shows

Variety/Talk Shows

Movies

Discography

Studio albums

 PARI: Gold (10,000+)

Compilation album

Extended plays

Singles

Awards and nominations

Performance awards

Music awards

Box-office awards

Special awards and recognitions

Entertainment awards

FHM rankings

References

External links

1987 births
Living people
21st-century Filipino actresses
21st-century Filipino women singers
Actresses from Metro Manila
Filipina gravure idols
Filipino child actresses
Filipino child singers
Filipino television actresses
Participants in Philippine reality television series
Reality show winners
GMA Network personalities
GMA Music artists
People from Las Piñas
StarStruck (Philippine TV series) participants
StarStruck (Philippine TV series) winners
Viva Artists Agency
Viva Records (Philippines) artists